The 1990 United States House of Representatives elections in South Carolina were held on November 6, 1990 to select six Representatives for two-year terms from the state of South Carolina.  The primary election for the Republicans was held on June 12.  All six incumbents were re-elected and the composition of the state delegation remained four Democrats and two Republicans. As of 2016, this is the last time that Democrats won a majority of congressional districts in South Carolina.

1st congressional district
Incumbent Republican Congressman Arthur Ravenel, Jr. of the 1st congressional district, in office since 1987, defeated Benjamin Hunt, Jr. in the Republican primary and Democratic challenger Eugene Platt in the general election.

Republican primary

General election results

|-
| 
| colspan=5 |Republican hold
|-

2nd congressional district
Incumbent Republican Congressman Floyd Spence of the 2nd congressional district, in office since 1971, defeated Libertarian challenger Gebhard Sommer.

General election results

|-
| 
| colspan=5 |Republican hold
|-

3rd congressional district
Incumbent Democratic Congressman Butler Derrick of the 3rd congressional district, in office since 1975, defeated Republican challenger Ray Haskett.

General election results

|-
| 
| colspan=5 |Democratic hold
|-

4th congressional district
Incumbent Democratic Congresswoman Liz J. Patterson of the 4th congressional district, in office since 1987, defeated Republican challenger Terry Haskins.

General election results

|-
| 
| colspan=5 |Democratic hold
|-

5th congressional district
Incumbent Democratic Congressman John M. Spratt, Jr. of the 5th congressional district, in office since 1983, was unopposed in his bid for re-election.

General election results

|-
| 
| colspan=5 |Democratic hold
|-

6th congressional district
Incumbent Democratic Congressman Robin Tallon of the 6th congressional district, in office since 1983, was unopposed in his bid for re-election.

General election results

|-
| 
| colspan=5 |Democratic hold
|-

See also
United States House elections, 1990
United States Senate election in South Carolina, 1990
South Carolina gubernatorial election, 1990
South Carolina's congressional districts

South Carolina
1990
1990 South Carolina elections